Fingerhut is a name of German and German Jewish origin. It may refer to:

 Foxgloves in German
 Thimble in German
 Fingerhut, an online retailer
 Eric Fingerhut, an American politician 
 Margaret Fingerhut, concert pianist
 The Fingerhut School of Education, a graduate school of American Jewish University